Gergely Boros is a Hungarian sprint canoer who has competed since the late 2000s. He won a gold medal in the K-4 200 m event at the 2007 ICF Canoe Sprint World Championships in Duisburg.

External links

Hungarian male canoeists
Living people
Year of birth missing (living people)
ICF Canoe Sprint World Championships medalists in kayak
21st-century Hungarian people